OMV may stand for:
OMV, an oil-producing, refining and gas station operating company in Austria
Oblati di Maria Vergine (Oblates of the Virgin Mary), a religious order of the Catholic Church
Omotic languages (ISO 639-5 language code)
Outer membrane vesicles, lipid vesicles released by Gram-negative bacteria
OpenMediaVault, a free network-attached storage server
Orbital Maneuvering Vehicle, defunct NASA space tug design